The Ḥasanids ( or) are the descendants of Ḥasan ibn ʿAlī, brother of Ḥusayn ibn ʿAlī and grandson of Muhammad.

In Morocco, the term is particularly applied to the descendants of Muhammad al-Nafs al-Zakiyya, to distinguish them from the Idrisid dynasty, which is also of Ḥasanid descent. The Moroccan Ḥasanids proper have produced two dynasties, the Saadi dynasty and the Alawite dynasty, which still reign over the country.

Dynasties
Notable Ḥasanid dynasties in the Muslim world include:
 Alawite dynasty of Morocco
 Alavid dynasty of Tabaristan
 Banu Ukhaidhir of Central Arabia
 Bolkiah dynasty of Brunei
 Hammudid dynasty of Southern Spain
 Idrisid dynasty of Morocco
 the various dynasties providing the Sharifs of Mecca; including the Hashemites (Banu Qatadah) of the Hejaz, Syria, and Iraq, now ruling only in Jordan
 Rassid dynasty of Yemen
 Saadi dynasty of Morocco
 Senussid dynasty of Algeria and Libya
 Sulaymanids of Mecca, Jizan, and Yemen
 Sulaymanid dynasty of Western Algeria

References

Sources